Daniel Jonathan Henk (born December 11, 1972) is an American artist and writer, noted for his work in tattooing and painting. He has produced record-album covers, political cartoons, controversial articles, and a variety of other media.
Growing up a disaffected army brat, his early life revolved around a punk rock subculture that included bouts of homelessness and societal rejection.

Early life
His beginning career included a year and a half stint drawing political cartoons for Madcap Magazine and illustrating underground projects and fanzines such as Maximum Rock and Roll. In 1997, after struggling through a violent car crash and a knife fight with a crackhead that severed the tendon on his left thumb, he managed to attend art school. Receiving some commercial and local gallery acclaim, he moved to New York City in an attempt to kick start an art career. Heavily immersing himself in the local hardcore scene, he produced artwork for the bands Shai Hulud, Indecision, Coalesce, Locked in a Vacancy, Beyond Reason, Zombie Apocalypse and various local record labels and venues.

Commercial success and tragedy
In 2000, he started tattooing, initially working on many musician friends. A year later, in September 2001, he was stricken with brain cancer and underwent surgery, chemotherapy, and radiation. In the midst of chemotherapy, he returned to his art projects with what seemed a renewed fervor. Three months later, he married fellow tattoo artist Monica Castillo. After a brief venture down south, that included owning a short-lived tattoo shop, he returned to Manhattan and applied himself to art full-time. A productive period followed, with his work appearing in both a growing number of tattoo magazines and more fine art-influenced outlets such as Aphrodesia, and The Tarot Project. Tattoo-related books such as No Regrets: The Best, Worst, & Most #$%*ing Ridiculous Tattoos Ever, Tattoo Prodigies 1, Tattoo Prodigies 2, and Inside the Tattoo Circus: A Journey Through the Modern World of Tattoos also took notice and included features on the young artist. Tragedy struck again in 2007, as his wife of 6 years, Monica Henk, was killed by an SUV while driving a motorcycle. Despite extensive coverage in the local media and vigorous campaigns by both the tattoo and motorcycle communities, the culprit was never found.

A new start
He moved to Austin, Texas for three years to reevaluate his career, and a heavy spate of activity followed. He started doing a regular comic strip entitled "Rollo & Me" for Tattoo Artist Magazine, as well as illustrations for Black Static Magazine, and This is Horror. His long-in-the-making first novel, The Black Seas of Infinity, was published by Anarchy Books in 2011. A limited edition chapbook entitled "Christmas Is Cancelled" came out courtesy of Splatterpunk in 2013. Relocating yet again, this time to Philadelphia, Pennsylvania, and then two years later back to Brooklyn, New York he's currently writing, illustrating, and tattooing.

He started writing a regular column for Tattoo Revue and Skin Art magazines in 2014. A reissue of his debut novel was put out by Permuted Press in April 2015, and a collection of his short stories entitled "Down Highways In The Dark...By Demons Driven" was released by the same publisher in August. He continued his work for independent magazines, doing art for Red Door Magazine, The Horror Zine, Litro Magazine, Out Of Step, and every issue so far of the British horror zine Splatterpunk. Books started to feature his artwork on their covers. "The Sopaths" by Piers Anthony, "Splatterpunks Not Dead", "Splatterpunk Fighting Back", "Past Indiscretions", "Bloodstains, "Insatiable", "The Flood"."Tales for Dark Hours" and "The Red Death".
His third novel "The End of the World" came out in April 2019. He currently runs a tattoo shop entitled The Abyss in Long Beach, NY, and hosts the Skull Session podcast.

References

External links
Official Site
Third Dimension podcast
Austin-Arts Interview
Tattmag Interview
Awesomegang Interview
This Is Horror Interview
Mil SciFi Interview
This Is writing Interview
NF Reads Interview
Interskart Feature
Book Reader Magazine
Red Door Magazine Interview
Paul Semel Interview 
Tattoo Media Ink Music Influence, Art & More
Tattoo Media Ink Illustrating Books & Magazines
Frequency 99 Podcast

1972 births
American tattoo artists
Living people
Artists from New York (state)